CIBC Square (known during early stages of development as Bay Park Centre) is an office complex in the South Core neighbourhood of Toronto, Ontario, Canada. The complex, located on Bay Street south of Front Street, is a joint development of Ivanhoé Cambridge and Hines. It will serve as the new global operational headquarters for the Canadian Imperial Bank of Commerce (CIBC), consolidating approximately 15,000 staff from several CIBC-tenanted buildings in the Greater Toronto Area, including its existing headquarters at Commerce Court. The complex also includes the Union Station Bus Terminal constructed on behalf of Metrolinx for GO Transit and other inter-city bus services, connected directly to Union Station. The complex will also include a one-acre park elevated over the rail corridor.

Design
The  complex will consist of two towers to be completed in two phases.

The 49 storey south tower (81 Bay Street) will be completed first, built on the site of a parking lot opposite the Scotiabank Arena. This tower includes the Union Station Bus Terminal for regional GO Transit and inter-city bus services, replacing the former terminal on Bay Street. A pedestrian skybridge links the complex to the Scotiabank Arena and Union Station, expanding the PATH walkway system further south below the railway corridor - to the One Yonge Street complex and ultimately to the under-development Sugar Wharf project on the LCBO lands farther east.

The south tower was scheduled to open in 2020 but was delayed until summer 2021.

The 50 storey north tower (141 Bay Street) will be built on the site of the former GO Transit bus terminal, located behind the Dominion Public Building. The north tower is scheduled for completion in 2024. The base of the towers will be a four-storey podium housing retail space, including a flagship CIBC retail bank branch.

At fourth floor level will be a one-acre, publicly accessible park, elevated over the railway corridor, with varied topography: slopes and hills, horticulture, gardens, shade groves, balconies, and vista areas.

The overall complex was designed by British architects WilkinsonEyre, and Adamson Associates of Toronto.

History
The development is being co-led by Ivanhoé Cambridge and Hines using land acquired from Metrolinx (as well as city-owned Toronto Parking Authority parking lot), and designed by British architectural firm WilkinsonEyre and Adamson Associates of Toronto. Ivanhoe Cambridge bought 81 Bay Street (formerly 45 Bay Street) in 2007 and later acquired additional land and air rights over the rail corridor. In September 2014, Ivanhoe agreed with Metrolinx to build the new GO Bus Terminal at 81 Bay Street.

Key tenants

Microsoft Canada will move into a  facility for its Canadian headquarters at 81 Bay Street. The Union Station Bus Terminal is located in the south tower of the new complex and replaced the previous bus terminal on the site where the north tower will be built. Unknown is the fate of the former CP Express & Transport Building dock door and limestone facade, which was incorporated into the previous GO bus terminal.

References

External links

Official project website
CIBC Square on Hines
CIBC Square on Ivanhoe Cambridge

Bank headquarters in Canada
Buildings and structures in Toronto
Modernist architecture in Canada
Skyscrapers in Toronto
Canadian Imperial Bank of Commerce
Skyscraper office buildings in Canada
Ivanhoé Cambridge
Hines Interests Limited Partnership
Buildings and structures under construction in Canada